The Estonian Financial Supervisory Authority (FI) (Estonian: Finantsinspektsioon) is the financial supervision and crisis resolution authority of the government of Estonia, responsible for the regulation of financial markets in Estonia. It works on behalf of the state of Estonia and is independent in its decision-making.

The supervisory activities of Finantsinspektsioon are divided between capital supervision and the supervision of markets and services.

In June 2006, Andres Palumaa was in charge when Andrey Kozlov warned him of a massive money laundering network involving two Estonian banks SEB Eesti Ühispank and Sampo Pank, corrupt FSB, and persons close to Vladimir Putin. Raul Malmstein was Estonia's chief Financial Officer. A very large amount of money had transited accounts with funds from the Nord Stream 1 project which to finance the building of a pipeline from Vyborg, Russia, to Lubmin near Greifswald, Germany. According to Natalia Morar's 21 May 2007 article in The New Times, Alexander Bortnikov, who was an FSB deputy deputy director as head of its economic security department, and Vladimir Putin were money laundering through Nord Stream funds at both Raiffeisen Zentralbank (Raiffeisen Zentralbank Oesterreich AG) in Austria and Diskont Bank in Russia.

Finantsinspektsioon is financed by the supervision and procedure fees paid by the subjects of financial supervision. It is part of the European Single Supervisory Mechanism since 2014.

See also 
 Economy of Estonia
 Bank of Estonia
 Government of Estonia

References 

Economy of Estonia
Government of Estonia